Isabella Ines Sermon (born 8 July 2006) is an English actress. She is known for her role as Maisie Lockwood in the films Jurassic World: Fallen Kingdom (2018) and Jurassic World Dominion (2022).

Early life and education
Sermon was born in the Kensington and Chelsea area of London. She was nine when she discovered acting through a school play production of James and the Giant Peach. She attends school and was in the midst of sitting her GCSEs in June 2022. She took acting classes with DMA London.

Filmography

References

External links 
 
 Isabella Sermon at Curtis Brown

Living people
2006 births
21st-century English actresses
Actresses from London
English child actresses
English film actresses
People from the Royal Borough of Kensington and Chelsea